Cherrington is a village in Shropshire, England, in the civil parish of Tibberton and Cherrington. It was recorded as a manor in Domesday, when it was held by Gerard de Tournai, and was stated to have been held by a man named Uliet in the time of Edward the Confessor, although it was recorded as "waste", in an uncultivated state, by the time Gerard took possession of it.

Its name is possibly derived from the Old English personal name Ceorl, or it may have originally been "Ceorranton" from the name Ceorra ("the settlement of Ceorra's people").

Cherrington is near to the larger village of Tibberton, to the east; Waters Upton is to the west and Great Bolas to the north-west. Newport is the nearest town. It contains several half-timbered buildings including Cherrington Manor, which dates from 1635 and was probably built for a landowner and Member of Parliament, Sir Richard Leveson of Lilleshall (1598-1661).

Cherrington Manor (or in some versions, the malt-house standing behind it) was popularly supposed to have been the building referenced in the nursery rhyme This Is the House That Jack Built. The story is, however, a purely local attribution with no particular evidence to back it up.

See also
Listed buildings in Tibberton and Cherrington

References

External links

Villages in Shropshire
Telford and Wrekin